Kemer is a seaside resort and district of Antalya Province, Turkey.

Kemer may also refer to:

Places
 Kemer, Burdur, Turkey, a town and district
 Kemer, Biga, Çanakkale, Turkey, a village
 Kemer, Kozan, Adana, Turkey, a village
 Kemer Dam, a dam in Bozdoğan, Aydın, Turkey
 Kemer railway station, a railway station in İzmir, Anatolia, Turkey

Other uses
 Kemer Cup, a tournament for professional female tennis players
 Cemre Kemer (born 1985), Turkish singer and songwriter

See also
 Kemerer (disambiguation)
 Kemmer